Babergh was a hundred of Suffolk, consisting of . Its name survives in that of Babergh District, the local government district of southern Suffolk that includes the former hundred as well as those of Cosford and Samford.

It consisted of the land to the north, east and south east of Sudbury, the hundred's largest town, and its southern boundary forms the border with Essex. The majority of the land is rural.

It was listed as Baberga in the Domesday Book and the name is believed to mean "Mound of a man called Babba".

The name derives from Babergh Heath, an area of land around the villages of Great and Little Waldingfield. The village of Great Waldingfield is home to Babergh Hall, the ancient meeting place of the hundred.

Parishes

Babergh Hundred consisted of the following 33 parishes:

References

Hundreds of Suffolk
Babergh Hundred